Omus dejeani is a species of flightless tiger beetle (Cicindelidae) that is found from British Columbia almost to northern California in dense, coastal forests. It is the largest species of the genus, at between 15 and 20 mm.

The genus Omus is placed within the tribe Omini, and is considered the most primitive of the tiger beetles. Omus is placed in Omini with the North American genera Amblycheila and the African Platychile.

It can be found quite commonly in suitable habitats in the spring. It is most often collected with pitfall traps, but can be found walking along trails at night and on cloudy days during the right time of year.

References

A Field Guide to the Tiger Beetles of the United States and Canada by David L. Pearson, C. Barry Knisley and Charles J. Kazilek.  Oxford University Press, 2005.

External links
 

Cicindelidae
Beetles of North America